The millennial whoop is a vocal melodic pattern alternating between the fifth note — the dominant —and the third note — the mediant — in a major scale, typically starting on the fifth, in the rhythm of straight 8th-notes, and often using the "wa" and "oh" syllables. It was used extensively in 2010s pop music.

Overview 

The term was coined by the musician Patrick Metzger, who described it in a blog entry on The Patterning in August 2016. He suggested that, while the millennial whoop gained popularity from the late 2000s to 2010s, it has probably always been around. An earlier use can be heard in the 1983 song "Jungle Love" by The Time, and, arguably, in Baltimora's 1985 hit "Tarzan Boy".

The 2017 song "Millennial Whoop" by American rock band the Pilgrims was written as a response to the idea of older generations looking down upon the younger for using such tropes: the song makes use of the interval pattern.

Lawsuit 
In 2013 songwriter Ally Burnett sued Carly Rae Jepsen and Owl City over their 2012 song "Good Time", arguing similarities to her 2010 song "Ah, It's a Love Song" and its use of the millennial whoop. Jepsen settled out of court, but Owl City won.

Uses 

Songs where the millennial whoop appear include:
 "Jungle Love" (1983, Morris Day and the Time)
 "Tarzan Boy" (1985, Baltimora) (the B-part of the ABAB-structured chorus)
 "Aaya Mausam Dosti Ka" (1989, Maine Pyar Kiya) (parts similar to "Tarzan Boy")
 "In the Shadows" (2003, The Rasmus)
 "Tik Tok" (2009, Kesha)
 "Bad Romance" (2009, Lady Gaga)
 "California Gurls" (2010, Katy Perry)
 "Till the World Ends" (2011, Britney Spears)
 "Good Time" (2012, Carly Rae Jepsen and Owl City)
 "The Mother We Share" (2012, Chvrches)
 "Habits (Stay High)" (2013, Tove Lo)
 "Really Don't Care" (2013, Demi Lovato featuring Cher Lloyd)
 "Ivy" (2016, Frank Ocean)
 "This Is Me" (2017, from The Greatest Showman) 
 The theme for the American animated television series DuckTales.

See also 
 Nyah nyah nyah nyah nyah nyah
 Harmonic series

References

External links 
 Original blog entry on thepatterning.com
 

Pop music
2010s in music
Musical terminology
2010s neologisms